Fedora is a 1942 Italian historical drama film directed by Camillo Mastrocinque and starring Luisa Ferida, Amedeo Nazzari and Osvaldo Valenti. It is based on the 1882 play of the same title by Victorien Sardou.

The film's sets were designed by the art director Ottavio Scotti. It was shot at the Cinecittà Studios in Rome.

Synopsis
In the Russian Empire during the 1870s, after her prospective groom is assassinated on her wedding day Princess Fedora vows revenge on the killer. In Paris she meets and falls in love with an artist, before realising that he is the assassin. After reporting him to the Russian secret police, she comes to understand his reasons for doing what he did.

Cast
 Luisa Ferida as Fedora 
 Amedeo Nazzari as Loris Ipanov / Ivan Petrovic 
 Osvaldo Valenti as Vladimiro Yariskine 
 Memo Benassi as Il principe Yariskine 
 Rina Morelli as Olga Soukarev 
 Sandro Ruffini as De Sirieux 
 Annibale Betrone as Boroff 
 Augusto Marcacci as Gretch 
 Nerio Bernardi as Il pianista Boleslao Lazinsky 
 Guido Celano as Cirillo 
 Mirza Capanna as Marka 
 Fedele Gentile as Il primo servo di casa Yariskine 
 Nino Marchesini as Il secondo servo di casa Yariskine 
 Elio Marcuzzo as Il giovane servitore 
 Alfredo Martinelli as Basilio 
 Beatrice Negri as Elisa, la modella 
 Cesare Polacco as L'usuraio Barnstein 
 Dina Romano as La padrona di casa di Boroff 
 Alfredo Varelli as Valeriano

References

Bibliography 
 Roberto Chiti & Roberto Poppi. I film: Tutti i film italiani dal 1930 al 1944. Gremese Editore, 2005.

External links 
 

1942 films
Italian historical films
1940s historical films
1940s Italian-language films
Films directed by Camillo Mastrocinque
Italian black-and-white films
Films shot at Cinecittà Studios
Films set in Russia
Films set in Paris
Films set in the 1870s
Films based on works by Victorien Sardou
1940s Italian films